International cricket, which had been suspended since 1939 due to the Second World War, resumed in 1946. From then until the end of 1959, the England cricket team, which represented England, Scotland and Wales in Test cricket, played 115 Test matches, resulting in 45 victories, 39 draws and 31 defeats. During this period, England faced Pakistan for the first time, when they toured England in 1954. During that tour, they became the first team to win a Test match on their first visit to England. England were the dominant team in international cricket during the 1950s; they did not lose a Test series between March 1951 and December 1958, and featured an array of stars such as Colin Cowdrey, Denis Compton, Fred Trueman, Brian Statham and Jim Laker.

England faced Australia most frequently during this period—playing 35 matches against them—followed by South Africa. England won more matches than they lost against India, New Zealand and South Africa, but against Australia they won seven and lost seventeen Ashes matches, while against the West Indies they won six and lost seven. They faced newcomers Pakistan in just four matches, winning one, losing one and drawing the others. England won 16 matches by an innings, with their largest victory being by an innings and 248 runs against New Zealand in 1958. Their largest victory by runs alone during this period was in 1956–57 against South Africa, when they won by 312 runs, while they won by ten wickets on four occasions. Conversely, England suffered their largest ever defeat, losing to Australia by an innings and 332 runs during the 1946–47 Ashes series.

Key

Matches

Summary

Notes

References

England in international cricket
England Test
Test